Shankar Patil Munenakoppa is an Indian politician who is currently serving as the Minister of Textiles & Sugarcane in Karnataka since 4 August 2021. He is a two time member of Karnataka Legislative Assembly from Navalgund constituency in Dharwad district. He had lost 2013 elections by a margin of 2669 votes against N. H. Konaraddi of JDS. He also served as the political secretary to Jagadish Shettar during latter's tenure as the Chief Minister.

References 

Living people
1969 births
Bharatiya Janata Party politicians from Karnataka